A hypothesis is a proposed explanation for a phenomenon.

Hypothesis may also refer to:

 Hypothesis (album), music by Vangelis
 Hypothesis (drama), in ancient usage, a summary of the plot of a classical drama
 Hypothesis of a theorem, in mathematics
 Hypothes.is, a website annotation software
 Hypothesis Z, the first Romanian war plan for World War I

Hypothetical may also refer to:
 Geoffrey Robertson's Hypotheticals, an Australian TV panel show
 Hypothetical (album), 2001 progressive metal album
 Hypothetical (TV series), a comedy TV show